Andrew John Evans (born ) is a South African rugby union player for the  in Super Rugby and the  in the Rugby Challenge. His regular position is lock.

References

1997 births
Living people
Rugby union locks
Rugby union players from Durban
Sharks (Currie Cup) players
Sharks (rugby union) players
South African rugby union players
Zimbabwean rugby union players
Zimbabwe Goshawks players